Grape Agate is a market name for purple aggregates of tiny quartz crystals with botryoidal (spherical) habit. Mineralogically speaking, grape agate is not an agate and is actually botryoidal purple chalcedony.

It occurs in Indonesia and has also been found west of the Green river in Utah.

References

Chalcedony